Woodbridge was a plantation formerly located on the Occoquan River in Prince William County, Virginia, across from Colchester. There was a ferry there. George Mason, a United States Founding Father, willed the land to Thomas Mason, his youngest son, in 1792. The unincorporated city of Woodbridge takes its name from the plantation.

References 

Houses in Prince William County, Virginia
Mason family residences
Plantations in Virginia